Ernst Moro (8 December 1874 – 1951) was an Austrian physician and pediatrician who was the first in western medicine to describe the infant reflex that was named after him (Moro reflex).

Career

Moro studied medicine in Graz, Austria, getting his M.D. in 1899. From 1901 to 1902 he worked with Theodor Escherich (1857–1911) in Vienna, the discoverer of the Escherichia coli bacterium. He earned his habilitation in pediatrics in Munich in 1906, and became a professor of pediatrics in the University of Heidelberg in 1911.

Besides the Moro reflex he became also known for the following:

 Proved the sterility of the normal small intestine
 Discovered that breast-fed children have stronger bactericidal activity in their blood than bottle-fed ones
 First described the irritable colon syndrome or recurrent abdominal pain ("Nabelkoliken") in children
 Isolated the bacterium Lactobacillus acidophilus from the stomach of children, which is caused by the souring of milk products
 Developed the Moro test (percutaneous tuberculin reaction)
 Coined the terms "first trimester" and "biological spring"
 Invented "Moro's milk", an infant-feeding formula composed by full cream milk with added 3% flour, 5% butter and 5-7% sugar.
 Invented Professor Moro's Carrot soup, which decreased the death rate of babies by diarrhea in Germany dramatically.
 Published about his later famous "apple diet" to cure diarrhea symptoms

In 1936, after the Nazis came to power, Moro resigned from his chair at the University of Heidelberg, alleging reasons of health. However the real motive was that he was married to Grete Moro, née Königsvald, of Jewish origin. He started a private clinic at Mozartstrasse 10 (where a commemorative plaque is now affixed) and retired in 1948.

Professor Moro's Carrot Soup
In 1908, diarrhea killed many babies in Germany. Professor Moro, at that time the head of a children hospital in Heidelberg, found out by experiment that a simple carrot soup decreased the death rate of babies suffering from diarrhea by nearly 50% .  The soup was made by pureeing 500 grams of peeled carrots in a blender, adding 1 liter of water, and then cooking it for one hour.  After cooking, 3 grams of salt were added, along with enough water until the soup pot contained a total of 1 liter of liquid.

A German study published in 2002 outlines that acidic oligosaccharides formed in aqueous extracts from carrots (carrot soup) may lead to less adherence of bacterial agents to the mucosal wall of the bowel, thus being a more effective treatment for acute gastrointestinal infections of children than glucose-electrolyte-solution oral rehydration.

In 2009, experiments showed that Professor Moro's Carrot Soup can treat diarrhea caused by antibiotic-resistant bacteria.

Apple diet
In 1929, Moro announced his later famous "apple diet" for the treatment of diarrheal conditions. The colleague August Heisler had pointed out to Moro the effect of apples as an old folk remedy for intestinal catarrh. When the entire Eugenien Hall was infected with enteritis, all the children ate raw apple porridge. A later clinical trial confirmed the results of the trial at Eugenien Hall. In Moro's opinion, the tannin content of raw grated apples caused certain detoxification processes to alleviate the symptoms of dyspepsia, dysentery and agitation-like illnesses.

Personal
Moro was married to Margareta Hönigswald. His son, Peter Moro, was a noted London architect.

References

 Ignatius J. "Moro reflex" Ernst Moro 1874-1951. Duodecim. 1993;109(9):789-91.
 Ernst Moro. Biography. WhoNamedIt
 Weirich A, Hoffmann GF.  "Ernst Moro (1874-1951) - A great pediatric career started at the rise of university-based pediatric research but was curtailed in the shadows of Nazi laws." European Journal of Pediatrics. 2005 Oct;164(10):599-606.  PubMed Abstract.

Austrian pediatricians
1874 births
1951 deaths
People from Ljubljana in health professions
Austro-Hungarian physicians